The Autovía A-6 or Autopista AP-6 (also called Autovía del Noroeste) is a Spanish autovía and autopista route that starts in Madrid and ends in Arteixo (A Coruña).

The tolled Autopista AP-6, from Villalba to Adanero, has a total length of 72.19 km. It includes one of the most important engineering works in the whole motorway, a tri-tube tunnel under the Sierra de Guadarrama.

Sections

Major cities crossed

Madrid
Collado Villalba
Medina del Campo
Tordesillas
Benavente
Astorga
Ponferrada
Lugo
Betanzos
A Coruña
Arteixo

External links
Autopista AP-6 Concessionaire
Autovía A-6 in Google Maps

A-6
A-6
A-6
A-6